Modise Mokwadi Fly was a Botswana politician and activist who was executed in 2010 for murdering his two-year-old son in 2006.

Fly was the general secretary of the Botswana Congress Party Youth League. On 27 November 2006, Fly killed his son Tawana Mosinyi with an axe while the boy was sleeping. He claimed that he had killed the boy accidentally, while throwing an axe at police outside his window. Fly contended that the police had  shot at him.

Fly was convicted of murder by the High Court in Francistown on 17 October 2008. On 21 October, Justice Thomas Masuku sentenced Fly to death by hanging and recommended that Fly appeal to the Court of Appeal of Botswana. His appeal was dismissed and he was subsequently executed on 24 March 2010.

Notes

References
Oarabile Mosikare, "Death Penalty Clips Fly's Wings", Mmegi, 2008-10-27, accessed 2009-01-16. 
——, "Botswana: BCP Activist Convicted of Murder", Mmegi, 2008-10-20, accessed 2009-01-16
"Fly faces gallows for son's murder", Republic of Botswana Daily News Archive, 2008-10-23, accessed 2009-01-16

2006 crimes in Botswana
2006 murders in Africa
2000s murders in Botswana
Botswana activists
Botswana Congress Party politicians
Botswana people convicted of murder
Executed Botswana people
People convicted of murder by Botswana
People executed by Botswana by hanging
Executed politicians
Filicides